Sheldon M. Ross is the Daniel J. Epstein Chair and Professor at the USC Viterbi School of Engineering. He is the author of several books in the field of probability.

Biography 
Ross received his B. S. degree in mathematics from Brooklyn College in 1963, his M.S. degrees in mathematics from Purdue University in 1964 and his Ph.D. degree in Statistics from Stanford University in 1968, studying under Gerald Lieberman and Cyrus Derman. He served as a Professor at the University of California, Berkeley from 1976 until joining the USC Viterbi School of Engineering in 2004. He serves as the Editor for several journals, among which Probability in the Engineering and Informational Sciences. In 2013 he became a fellow of the Institute for Operations Research and the Management Sciences.

In 1978, he formulated what became known as Ross's conjecture in queuing theory, which was solved three years later by Tomasz Rolski at Poland's Wroclaw University.

Selected publications 
 Ross S. M. (1970) Applied Probability Models with Optimization Applications. Holden-Day: San Francisco, CA.
 Ross S. M. (1972) Introduction to Probability Models. Academic Press: Waltham, MA.
 Ross S. M. (1976) A First Course in Probability. MacMillan Publishing Company: London.
 Ross S. M. (1982) Stochastic Processes. John Wiley & Sons: New York.
 Ross S. M. (1983) Introduction to Stochastic Dynamic Programming. Academic Press: Waltham, MA.
 Ross S. M. (1995) Introductory Statistics. Academic Press: Waltham, MA.
 Ross S. M. (1996) Simulation. Academic Press: Waltham, MA.
 Derman C. & Ross S. M. (1997) Statistical Aspects of Quality Control. Academic Press: Waltham, MA.
 Ross S. M. (1999) An Elementary Introduction to Mathematical Finance: Options and Other Topics. Cambridge University Press: Cambridge.
 Ross S. M. (2000) Topics in Finite and Discrete Mathematics. Cambridge University Press: Cambridge.
 Ross S. M. (2001) Probability Models for Computer Science. Academic Press: Waltham, MA.

References

External links

Living people
Mathematicians from California
University of Southern California faculty
Brooklyn College alumni
Purdue University alumni
Stanford University alumni
University of California, Berkeley faculty
American statisticians
20th-century American mathematicians
21st-century American mathematicians
Year of birth missing (living people)
American textbook writers